America was originally set to participate in the 2006 InterLiga tournament, but their 2005 clausura championship qualified the team for the 2006 CONCACAF Champions' Cup. Therefore, the club was replaced by Cruz Azul. The teams Tigres and Chivas de Guadalajara qualified to Copa Libertadores 2006

Groups

Group A

Group B

Match schedule
Matches at Reliant Stadium (Houston, Texas)

Matches at La Joya Stadium (La Joya, Texas)

Matches at Pizza Hut Park (Frisco, Texas)

Matches at The Home Depot Center (Carson, California)

2006
Inter